The mixed doubles tournament of the 2022 BWF World Championships took place from 22 to 28 August 2022 at the Tokyo Metropolitan Gymnasium in Tokyo.

Seeds

The seeding list was based on the World Rankings of 9 August 2022.

  Zheng Siwei / Huang Yaqiong (champions)
  Dechapol Puavaranukroh / Sapsiree Taerattanachai (third round)
  Yuta Watanabe / Arisa Higashino (final)
  Wang Yilyu / Huang Dongping (semi-finals)
  Seo Seung-jae / Chae Yoo-jung (quarter-finals)
  Tang Chun Man / Tse Ying Suet (quarter-finals)
  Thom Gicquel / Delphine Delrue (third round)
  Tan Kian Meng / Lai Pei Jing (quarter-finals)

  Mark Lamsfuß / Isabel Lohau (semi-finals)
  Mathias Christiansen / Alexandra Bøje (second round)
  Goh Soon Huat / Shevon Jemie Lai (quarter-finals)
  Yuki Kaneko / Misaki Matsutomo (second round)
  Rinov Rivaldy / Pitha Haningtyas Mentari (third round)
  Supak Jomkoh / Supissara Paewsampran (third round)
  Robin Tabeling / Selena Piek (third round)
  Chang Tak Ching / Ng Wing Yung (second round)

Draw

Finals

Top half

Section 1

Section 2

Bottom half

Section 3

Section 4

References 

2022 BWF World Championships